Weston is an unincorporated community in Jackson Parish, Louisiana, United States.
Weston has a pre-k through 12th grade school. Weston High School's mascot a wolf. 
Weston is located between Jonesboro and Chatham, Louisiana.

Unincorporated communities in Jackson Parish, Louisiana
Unincorporated communities in Louisiana